Karly is an English feminine given name that is a feminine form of Carl and an alternate form of Carla. Notable people referred to by this name include the following:

Given name
Karly Gaitán Morales (born 1980), Nicaraguan writer, journalist, and film historian
Karly Robertson (born 1989), Scottish figure skater
Karly Roestbakken (born 2001), Australian football player
Karly Rothenberg, American actress
Karly Shorr (born 1994), American snowboarder

Fictional characters
 Karly, a doll in the Groovy Girls line, by Manhattan Toy

See also

Carly
Kaly (disambiguation)
Karby (disambiguation)
Karsy (disambiguation)
Karay (surname)
Karl (given name)
Karla (name)
Karle (name)
Karley
Karli (name)
Karlo (name)
Kary (name)
Karly, Gafuriysky District, Republic of Bashkortostan, Russian village

Notes

English feminine given names